The American Thermos Bottle Company Laurel Hill Plant, located in the Laurel Hill section of Norwich, Connecticut,  in the United States, includes 11 contributing buildings and two other contributing structures. The original plant was built during 1912–13 and used a historic Italianate house as a company office building. The plant was the primary factory where Thermos brand vacuum flask bottles were manufactured from 1913 to 1984. The plant is historically significant to its connection to the Thermos Company and the history of Norwich. The complex is architecturally significant because it displays the adaptive use of industrial mill design to new industry. It was added to the National Register of Historic Places in 1989.

Since its nomination, numerous changes and renovations have occurred. The surrounding area has seen the construction of condominiums and the large manufacturing building being renovated and re-purposed for loft-style apartments. Renovations on the northern end of the property would require the demolition of two buildings to construct the Integrated Day Charter School. Completed in 2008, a new two-story addition created an indoor gymnasium, kitchen, offices and a new lobby for the school.

Background 
The citizens of Norwich, Connecticut, sought out the Thermos company to build and operate a plant on the banks of the Thames River. A group of citizens under the group "Norwich Boomers" rallied the community to purchase  of land for  so that it could be used for the Thermos Plant. The house of Dr. William H. Mason was included in the purchase. The Italianate house was converted to be used as an office building. Together, the citizens and the city raised $78,000. A contract was signed on February 14, 1912, designating Norwich as the home of the Thermos Plant. In return, Thermos would include the city's name in the company's advertisements. Thermos would even mark the products produced in Norwich with "Made in Norwich". Allyn L. Brown acted as attorney and provided counsel for the deal.  The construction of the plant was a boon for Norwich, which helped the employment of the area after the decline of the textile industry. The operations expanded into nearby Taftville, operating until they were phased out and shut down in 1988.

Plant overview 

The plant was laid out roughly north to south orientation along the Thames River. The plant itself is a mixture of interconnected buildings and stand-alone structures. The stand-alone structures included three propane sheds (Buildings 63, 64 and 65) that were located near the Human Resources building (Building 86) and its storage shed (Building 30). The main structure of the plant was a string of connecting buildings that were erected and integrated into the production and operation of the plant. At the north end of the plant was the Research and Development building (Building 87), it was located connected to two large storage buildings (Building 1 and 2). On the front of Building 2 was the main offices (Building 85). Building 2 is connected to the largest building, the Manufacturing Building (Building 3), which is connected to the Manufacturing Glass House (Building 5) and Glass House 2 (Building 32). Building 32 also served as storage building. Connected to Building 5 is the Glass House Cullet & Mix House (Number 7) and the Compressor & Auxiliary Generator building (Number 9) at the southern end.

Originally, the plant consisted of the company offices and the large Manufacturing Building. The Mason house, which would become the company office was originally constructed in 1861. It is a two-story brick Italianate style house that was converted to be used as an office building and significantly modified throughout the years. The 1929 addition added a wing that connected it to the metal products building which was built that year. In 1942, a two-story front addition was added and another addition to the west was added around 1950. These additions also resulted in the removal of the cupola, brick chimneys, front entry, and veranda. The Manufacturing building, constructed from 1912 to 1913, is three stories high on the river side and two stories on the east. It is divided into 31 bays with pilasters. At each end of the building are stairs and elevator towers. The structural remains of the original glass house survive as a sub-basement in a one-story extension at the south end of the building.

The Human Resources and Research and Development buildings were originally constructed around 1912 by the MacKay Copper Process Company. The property was acquired in 1923 by the Thermos Company following the foreclosure of the MacKay company. The Human Resources building was used by the enameling department until its conversion in 1948. The Research and Development building was previously the Engineering building. A one-story hipped frame gatehouse was constructed in the 1920s. The Carpenter Shop (Building 62) was constructed in 1926. The Thermos factory completed construction of a storage building in 1929 (Building 2) and another storage building in 1941 (Building 1). Glass House 1 (Building 5) was constructed in 1939 and incorporates a warehouse dating from 1930 into its construction. Glass House 2 was constructed in 1951 and is connected to the Manufacturing Building by a conveyor.

Modern use and adaptation 
The plant was a set in the 1990 movie Everybody Wins, after which the property was partially redeveloped into condominiums. The project failed and resulted in the closure of the Brooklyn Savings Bank in 1990. The Thermos on Thames condominium assets were acquired by the Federal Deposit Insurance Corporation and was purchased by TOT Transfer for $420,000. The factory was also converted to loft-style apartments.

In 1997, the Integrated Day Charter School renovated a  section of the factory for use as a school. This required the demolition of two buildings to serve as space for a playground and parking spaces. The total cost of the renovations were estimated at $750,000 and would be partly paid by the State of Connecticut. The renovations were expected to be completed by August 27, 1997, in time for the school's opening. Integrated Day Charter School has a maximum enrollment of 330 students across pre-kindergarten to eighth grade with a majority of children residing in the Norwich area and 15% in nearby towns. The charter school has an application wait list and holds a lottery for admittance of pre-kindergarten students.

Since the time of its NRHP nomination, the plant and the surrounding area have undergone numerous changes which have impacted and removed buildings. The construction of the Integrated Day Charter School removed the Research and Development and Storage Building 1. The "Colosseum" as it was termed, was an outdoor gym which retained sides of the former building. Completed in 2008, the two-story addition created an indoor gymnasium, kitchen, offices and a new lobby for the school at a cost of $2 million. The renovation of the large Manufacturing building included the installation of new windows and energy-efficient roofing along with the installation of modern mechanical, electrical and plumbing systems.

Significance 
The American Thermos Bottle Company Laurel Hill Plant is historically significant as the primary factory for the production of Thermos bottles that would allow the company to dominate in the world market. It is also historically significant as an example of the Norwich community coming together to attract the company and diversify the local industry. The plant was the primary factory where Thermos bottles were manufactured from raw materials between 1913 and 1984. The complex is architecturally significant as an example of late-19th century and early 20th century industrial mill design being adapted for new industry. The American Thermos Bottle Company Laurel Hill Plant was added to the National Register of Historic Places in 1989.

See also 
 List of bottle types, brands and companies
National Register of Historic Places listings in New London County, Connecticut

Notes

References 

Buildings and structures in Norwich, Connecticut
Industrial buildings and structures on the National Register of Historic Places in Connecticut
Italianate architecture in Connecticut
Industrial buildings completed in 1861
National Register of Historic Places in New London County, Connecticut
Historic districts in New London County, Connecticut
1861 establishments in Connecticut
Historic districts on the National Register of Historic Places in Connecticut
Vacuum flasks